Don Wesely (born March 30, 1954 ) was the 49th mayor of Lincoln, Nebraska. He previously served in the Nebraska Legislature from 1979-1999.

Biography
Wesely was born March 30, 1954 in David City, Nebraska. He graduated from Lincoln Northeast High School, then went on to receive his B.A. Degree from the University of Nebraska-Lincoln in 1977 and attended graduate school at UNL. Wesely is the father of three children: Sarah, Amanda and Andrew.

Political career
Wesely was first elected to the Nebraska Legislature in 1978. He was only twenty-four when elected and was a graduate student at the University of Nebraska-Lincoln. He was the third-youngest person ever to serve in that body. Wesely is a member of the Democratic Party. During his tenure, more than 300 legislative initiatives sponsored or co-sponsored by Wesely were successfully enacted into state law. His committee work included 14 years as Chairman of the Health and Human Services Committee. When he retired after 20 years in the legislature, Wesely was the eighth longest serving state senator in Nebraska history. He was only forty-four years-old upon his retirement from the legislature.

In 1999, Wesely was elected mayor of Lincoln, Nebraska, with 56% of the vote.  He served only one term as Mayor.  Following his departure from the mayor's office, he became a lobbyist for the state legislature.

Wesely was a delegate to the 1996 Democratic National Convention and the 2000 Democratic National Convention

References 

1954 births
Living people
Mayors of Lincoln, Nebraska
Democratic Party Nebraska state senators
University of Nebraska–Lincoln alumni
People from David City, Nebraska